An ain is a spring in North Africa, which reaches the surface as a result of an artesian basin and is of particular importance in arid regions. It can produce a flow of water directly or result in evaporitic saline crusts. Known examples are found in the oases of the Tunisian region of Bled el Djerid and in the entire area around  the depressions of Chott el Djerid and Chott el Gharsa. Here, there are water-bearing strata, usually of sand or sandstone, that act as aquifers in their function.

Springs (hydrology)
Bodies of water
Drinking water
Springs of Africa
Bodies of water of Africa